This article lists running mates considered by John B. Anderson during his 1980 independent candidacy for President of the United States. Anderson, a Republican representative from Illinois, launched an independent candidacy after dropping out of the Republican primaries. On August 26, 1980, Anderson announced his selection of former Democratic Governor Patrick Lucey of Wisconsin as his running mate. Anderson had previously stated that he wanted to choose a liberal Democrat such as Arizona Representative Mo Udall as his running mate. Anderson also seriously considered naming a black or female candidate, but ultimately went with the safer choice of Lucey. The Anderson–Lucey ticket took 6.6% of the popular vote in the 1980 presidential election.

Other potential candidates
New York Governor Hugh Carey (D)
Boston Mayor Kevin White (D)
Former Texas Representative Barbara Jordan (D)
New York Representative Shirley Chisholm (D)
Former Massachusetts Senator Edward Brooke (R)

See also
1980 United States presidential election
John Anderson presidential campaign, 1980

References

1980
1980 United States presidential election